Remember Rose (born 25 February 2003) is an Irish racehorse, by Insatiable out of Couture Rose, bred and owned by Ernst Iten and trained by Jean-Paul Gallorini. He won the 2009 Grand Steeple-Chase de Paris, ridden by Christophe Pieux. He has won eight of his 25 starts.

References

External links
Remember Rose's pedigree and partial racing stats

2003 racehorse births
Racehorses bred in Ireland
Racehorses trained in France
Byerley Turk sire line
Thoroughbred family 2-n